Brynkir railway station was opened by the Carnarvonshire Railway on the western edge of the village of Bryncir, Gwynedd, Wales.

The station was not heavily used, but it had two platforms and remained open until the line closed because it was a crossing place where the otherwise single track route became twin track for a short distance, it also had facilities for locomotives to replenish their water tanks.

An accident involving passengers occurred at the station on 6 September 1866, before formal opening.

The station was host to a LMS caravan from 1935 to 1939. A camping coach was also positioned here by the London Midland Region from 1954 to 1955.

The line and station closed on 7 December 1964 as recommended in the Beeching Report.

References

Sources

Further material

External links
 The station site on a navigable OS Map, via National Library of Scotland
 The station and line, via Rail Map Online
 The line CNV with mileages, via Railway Codes
 Images of the station, via Yahoo
 The station and line, via LNWR Society
 Brynkir in the First World War, via Love My Wales
 By DMU from Pwllheli to Amlwch, via Huntley Archives

Disused railway stations in Gwynedd
Dolbenmaen
Railway stations in Great Britain opened in 1867
Railway stations in Great Britain closed in 1964
Former London and North Western Railway stations